Jorge Benjamín Araya Quezada (21 September 1924 – 28 December 1992) was a Chilean footballer. He played in eight matches for the Chile national football team from 1946 to 1947. He was also part of Chile's squad for the 1947 South American Championship.

References

External links
 

1924 births
1992 deaths
Chilean footballers
Chile international footballers
Club de Deportes Green Cross footballers
Chilean Primera División players
Association football forwards
20th-century Chilean people
Place of birth missing
Place of death missing